Lake Hanska may refer to:

 Lake Hanska Township, Brown County, Minnesota, U.S.
 Lake Hanska, a lake in Brown County, Minnesota, U.S.

See also
 Hanska, Minnesota, U.S.